Máirín McAleenan is a camogie player, winner of an All-Star award in 2004.

Early career
She shot to prominence when Down won the National League Division 2 and the All Ireland Intermediate Championship in 1998, scoring 9-35 during the league campaign, 1–2 in the intermediate semi-final and 1–7 in the final.

All Star Year
She was play-maker in 2004 when Leitrim Fontenoys won their first All Ireland Junior Club Championship beating Four Roads of Roscommon by 4-13 to 0–8. She featured on the Down team beaten in the All Ireland junior final that year, scoring Down's second goal,

References

External links
 Profile in Cúl4kidz magazine

Living people
Down camogie players
Year of birth missing (living people)